Mario Bonomo (25 January 1912 – 28 August 1983) was an Italian ski jumper. He competed in the individual event at the 1936 Winter Olympics.

References

External links
 

1912 births
1983 deaths
Italian male ski jumpers
Olympic ski jumpers of Italy
Ski jumpers at the 1936 Winter Olympics
People from Asiago
Sportspeople from the Province of Vicenza